Motor Oil (Hellas) Corinth Refineries S.A. is a petroleum industry based in Greece focusing on oil refining and trading. It is a leading force in its sector in Southern Europe and the Mediterranean.

History
Motor Oil Hellas was founded on May 7, 1970, by Vardis Vardinogiannis and Georgios Paraschos Aleksandridis. It is headquartered in Marousi, Greece. Since 1972 Vardis J. Vardinoyannis serves as chairman and managing director. The company has over 2,000 employees. Despite the Greek crisis in 2015, the company had thrived.

In 2020 Motor Oil Hellas gave TechnipFMC a significant engineering, procurement, and construction management services contract. The construction work is scheduled to be complete in 2021.

Refinery, facilities and gas stations
Through its Korinthos refinery, Motor Oil controls the remaining 35% of the refining sector in Greece. The company operates the second-largest refiner (Corinth Refinery) in Europe and the Cairo-based oil and gas exploration and production facilities in Egypt. It also owns the Avin, Shell and Cyclon chain of fuel stations in Greece which are more than 2,000 along with a host of other gas and energy-related businesses.

Subsidiaries and affiliates
Motor Oil Hellas has numerous subsidiares such as Avin Oil Industrial, Commercial and Maritime Company S.M.S.A., Coral Oil and Chemicals Company S.A., Coral Commercial and Industrial Gas Company S.A., LPC S.M.S.A. Corporation of Processing and Trading of Lubricants and Petroleum Products, NRG Supply and Trading S.M.S.A., OFC Aviation Fuel Services S.A., Korinthos Power S.A., Shell & MOH Aviation Fuels S.A. and Athens Airport Fuel Pipeline Company.

Ownership
Motor Oil's majority shareholder is two holding companies (Petroventure and Motor Oil Limited with 40.77%), that belongs to the prominent Greek family of Vardinogiannis, the rest of its shares are available to the public through a float on the Athens and the London Stock Exchange.

See also

Energy in Greece

References

External links

Hoovers.com profile
MOTOR OIL HELLAS | (finance.google.com profile)
MOTOR OIL (HELLAS) (MOH.AT) | (finance.yahoo.com profile)
MOTOR OIL (MOH) - Athens | (capital.gr profile)

Oil and gas companies of Greece
Companies listed on the Athens Exchange
Greek brands
Multinational companies headquartered in Greece